Nicky Serghei Cleșcenco (born 23 July 2001) is a footballer who plays as a left winger for Sion II. Born in Ireland, he represents the Moldova national team.

Club career
Cleșcenco played for Dacia Buiucani in his youth, before moving to Portugal in 2014 to play for the academies of Sporting CP and União de Leiria. During the 2019–20 season, he made six senior appearances for União de Leiria in the Campeonato de Portugal. In February 2021, he joined the reserve team of Swiss club Sion, playing in the Promotion League.

International career
Cleșcenco made his international debut for Moldova on 3 June 2021, coming on as a substitute in the 87th minute for Dan Spătaru in a friendly match against Turkey. The match in Paderborn finished as a 2–0 loss.

Personal life
Cleșcenco was born in Dublin, Ireland, and is the son of former footballer and manager Serghei Cleșcenco, the all-time top scorer for the Moldova national team.

Career statistics

International

References

External links
 

2001 births
Living people
Association footballers from Dublin (city)
Moldovan footballers
Moldova international footballers
Moldova under-21 international footballers
Republic of Ireland association footballers
Irish people of Moldovan descent
Association football wingers
U.D. Leiria players
FC Sion players
Campeonato de Portugal (league) players
Swiss Promotion League players
Moldovan expatriate footballers
Moldovan expatriate sportspeople in Portugal
Expatriate footballers in Portugal
Moldovan expatriate sportspeople in Switzerland
Expatriate footballers in Switzerland